TRF may refer to:

Medicine and Science
 Terminal restriction fragments, used in measuring telomere length
 Thyrotropin-releasing factor, a peptide hormone secreted by the hypothalamus
 Time-restricted feeding, a type of intermittent fasting
 Transfer RNA-derived fragment
 TERF1, Telomeric repeat-binding factor 1 (also known as TRF1)

Places
 Sandefjord Airport, Torp, Norway, IATA code
 Thief River Falls, Minnesota, USA

Organisations
 Tactical recognition flash, UK armed forces
 Texas Renaissance Festival, USA
 Thoroughbred Retirement Foundation, racehorse rescue organization
 TRF (band), a J-pop group
 Regional Federal Courts, Brazilian Federal appellate courts

Other
 Tuned radio frequency receiver, a type of radio
 Trinidadian Creole, by ISO 639 code
 TRF1, French howitzer